The men's 50 metre freestyle competition at the 1997 Pan Pacific Swimming Championships took place on August 13 at the NISHI Civic Pool.  The last champion was Gary Hall, Jr. of US.

This race consisted of one length of the pool in freestyle.

Records
Prior to this competition, the existing world and Pan Pacific records were as follows:

Results
All times are in minutes and seconds.

Heats
The first round was held on August 13.

B Final 
The B final was held on August 13.

A Final 
The A final was held on August 13.

References

1997 Pan Pacific Swimming Championships